Kostin Log is a rural locality (a selo) in Kostino-Logovskoy Selsoviet of Mamontovsky District, Altai Krai, Russia. The population was 1,209 in 2016. There are 12  streets.

Geography 
Kostin Log is located 42 km east of Mamontovo (the district's administrative centre) by road. Travnoye is the nearest rural locality.

References 

Rural localities in Mamontovsky District